Damboa is a Local Government Area of Borno State, Nigeria. Its headquarters are in the town of Damboa. 
It has an area of 6,219 km² and had a population of 233,200 at the 2006 census.

The postal code of the area is 601.
The original settlers of Damboa are the Marghi people, but due to the booming economy of Damboa in the Calabash farming business during this period made many Kanuri people keep travelling to and fro to Damboa in the first place and later end up settling and marrying in Damboa at a later stage. As a result many of the Damboa people end up becoming half Kanuri and Half Marghi although there are still pure Marghi family as well as pure Kanuri family even as at today. This cultural assimilation brought a little discrepancies among the indigenes of Damboa because some people in Damboa prefers to be identified as Marghi while some other ones preferred to be identified as Kanuris, but the truth is that Damboa composed of Marghi majority and Kanuri minority in the town settle at the Local Government Area.

Elders of Damboa

ENGR.(Dr) Mohammed Abba Gana
Comrade Modu Shettima
Alhaji Abaya Lawan
Alhaji Bulama Korede
Karagama M. Kauji
Malami Wakil Korede
Late Dr. Lawan Kabu
Late Alaji Malam Gaji Damboa
Hon Grema Umar
Modu Yerima Gumsuri 
Late Babagana Abbas Dawa
Habu Hong
Babagana Musa Kauji
Alhaji Kaumi Damboa
Mohammed Salisu
Ayemu Lawan Gwasha 
Mustapha Tokebe
Karagama Yaga 
Karagama Azir
Lawan Makinta
Abdullahi Karagama
Habu Daja Damboa
Lawan Kolomi (LK)
Barr. Mohammed Wakil
Prof. Adamu Garba Alooma (Chairman Elect) 
Adamu Tubo Usman
Alamin Mohammed Gumsuri
Alhaji Darman Korede
Alhaji Bukar Petrol

It was one of the sixteen LGAs that constituted the Borno Emirate before establishing Damboa Emirate Council, a traditional state located in Borno State, Nigeria.

Notable births and residents
Notable births and current and former residents of Damboa include:
Mohammed Abba Gana, Former FCT Minister, Commissioner Northern Eastern State

Health 
A 1989 study showed a high rate of guinea worm infection among two groups of families in Mafi and Kawaram, Damboa LGA.

Boko Haram 
A 2012 article in Vanguard News noted the death of Alhaji Lawan Kabu, former Chairman Damboa Local Government Area. It suggested that some of the perpetrators of violence in Borno State were using Boko Haram as an excuse for political violence.

A 28 May 2014 report in the Premium Times quoted "a spokesperson of the local vigilante" as saying:
“Places like Talasla, Ajigin, Mangozam, Abima, Abulam, Keloruwa; all within Damboa Local Government Area have now been taken over by the Boko Haram gunmen”.

A 25 June 2014 report of an attack on a military post at Bulabulin Ngaura was not confirmed by military sources.

On 26 June 2014, Borno State Governor Kashim Shettima had "ordered an investigation into alleged abduction of 60 women by suspected insurgents in Damboa Local Government Area," in the villages of Kummabza, Yaga and Dagu.

On 18 July 2014 Damboa was attacked, with "at least 18 dead ... Eyewitnesses told the BBC that half of Damboa had been burnt down, including the town's main market."

As of 19 October 2014, the town was under Boko Haram control; however, the Arewa Consultative Forum (ACF) had "issued an official statement ... saying that the ceasefire deal announced by government must be followed with the return of all territories captured by the insurgents." On 21 October, 35 insurgents were killed in an attack by 195 Battalion of the 7 Division of the Nigerian Army.

References

 https://www.thenigerianvoice.com/news/279403/zulum-coas-inspect-maiduguri-damboa-road-pledge-adequate.html
 https://www.premiumtimesng.com/regional/nwest/428339-lg-polls-two-professors-26-others-contest-chairmanship-posts-in-borno.html

Local Government Areas in Borno State
Populated places in Borno State